Tyrone Scott Braxton (born December 17, 1964) is a former American football safety who played for the Denver Broncos for most of his career from 1987 to 1999. Braxton played in four Super Bowls with the Broncos, and won 2 NFL championship rings in Super Bowl XXXII and Super Bowl XXXIII. Braxton also played one season with the Miami Dolphins in 1994 and was a one time Pro Bowler in 1996, a season in which he led the National Football League in interceptions with nine.

Early life and college
Braxton attended James Madison Memorial High School in Madison, Wisconsin. He played college football at North Dakota State University where he earned all-conference honors as a senior and was drafted by the Broncos in the 12th round of the 1987 NFL Draft, the second to last pick overall. He has a Master of Social Work from Metropolitan State University of Denver.

NFL career
In 1990, Braxton had reconstructive knee surgery. He was released after the 1993 season, after being blamed a "scapegoat" behind for a Broncos defense that struggled. The team would finish last in total defense in 1994, the year he was away from the team. After a season as a backup safety with the Miami Dolphins, Braxton was re-signed by the Broncos prior to the 1995 season. In 1996, he was tied for the lead in interceptions with St. Louis Rams safety  Keith Lyle with nine. In Super Bowl XXXII, he recorded a key interception from Brett Favre that set up a Broncos touchdown.

Braxton finished his 13 NFL seasons with 36 interceptions, which he returned for 617 yards and four touchdowns. He also recorded three sacks and 10 fumble recoveries, which he returned for 106 yards.

Personal life
His brother was convicted in a drug charge and served one year in a Wisconsin state prison back in the 1980s. A second brother served a 25-year prison sentence for armed robbery, while more of his friends were either arrested or died because of drug related issues, which inspired a career for Braxton in the youth ministry.

References

1964 births
Living people
Sportspeople from Madison, Wisconsin
Players of American football from Wisconsin
American football cornerbacks
American football safeties
Denver Broncos players
Miami Dolphins players
American Conference Pro Bowl players
North Dakota State Bison football players